Sight and Cast is a Canadian outdoors television series which aired on CBC Television from 1965 to 1966.

Premise
Tiny Bennett, an author of fishing and hunting subjects, hosted this series.

Scheduling
This half-hour series was broadcast on Sundays at 4:00 p.m. (Eastern time) from 26 September 1965 to 2 January 1966.

References

External links
 

CBC Television original programming
1965 Canadian television series debuts
1966 Canadian television series endings